Magdy A Ishak MD, FRCS, CCIM (born 1947 in Suez, Egypt), is an orthopedic surgeon and the President of the Egyptian Medical Society UK. He is also Chairman of the Scottish-Egyptian Association and Vice Chairman of the British Egyptian Society. he is also Chairman of M I Holdings. He is honorary Companion Chartered Institute of Management.

Magdy is married to Rita GadelRab, a consultant anesthetist , and has one daughter, Lorraine, a maxillofacial surgeon.

See also 
List of Copts
Lists of Egyptians

References

External links
Egyptian Medical Society site
British Egyptian Society

Egyptian people of Coptic descent
Egyptian orthopaedic surgeons
Egyptian emigrants to England
1947 births
Living people
People from Suez